Wildmoorway Meadows is a  biological Site of Special Scientific Interest in Gloucestershire, to the east of Fairford, notified in 1989. The site is listed in the 'Cotswold District' Local Plan 2001-2011 (on line) as a Key Wildlife Site (KWS).

Location and habitat
The site is between the River Churn and the disused Thames and Severn Canal. It is on the alluvium and gravels of the Thames floodplain.  It is made-up of a number of ancient, unimproved meadows and the old ridge and furrow remains visible. This is one of the largest remaining examples of its type in south-east Gloucestershire, and has been traditionally managed by hay cutting and grazing of stock.

Flora
The grassland species include Crested Dog's-tail, Common Knapweed.  There is an abundance of Quaking Grass and Sweet Vernal-grass. The species count of grasses and sedges is significant (more than 20). Typical herbs associated with old meadows are plentiful including Cowslip, Betony, Pepper Saxifrage and Ox-eye Daisy.  Orchids include the Green-winged Orchid.

Meadowsweet, Ragged-robin and Reed Canary-grass are recorded in the wet areas.  Orchids include Southern Marsh Orchid.

There is some scrub and individual old trees, particularly Black poplar, are present in the hedgerows.

References

SSSI Source
 Natural England SSSI information on the citation
 Natural England SSSI information on the Wildmoorway Meadows unit

External links
 Natural England (SSSI information)

Sites of Special Scientific Interest in Gloucestershire
Sites of Special Scientific Interest notified in 1989
Meadows in Gloucestershire